Hubert Baumgartner (born 25 February 1955) is an Austrian former football player and manager. As a player, Baumgartner played professionally as a goalkeeper in both Austria and Spain; he also played at international level and was a squad member at the 1978 FIFA World Cup. After retiring as a player, Baumgartner became a football manager.

Career
Born in Wolfsberg, Baumgartner played professionally in both Austria and Spain for Alpine Donawitz,  Austria Wien, Recreativo de Huelva, Admira Wacker and VSE St. Pölten, making over 400 career appearances.

He earned one cap for the Austrian national team in 1978, and was a squad member at the 1978 FIFA World Cup.

He also managed  VSE St. Pölten, Rapid Wien and FC Linz.

Honours

Austrian Football Bundesliga (3):
 1975, 1978, 1979
Austrian Cup (1):
 1977

References

1955 births
Living people
People from Wolfsberg
Austrian footballers
Austria international footballers
Association football goalkeepers
1978 FIFA World Cup players
FK Austria Wien players
Recreativo de Huelva players
FC Admira Wacker Mödling players
Austrian Football Bundesliga players
Austrian football managers
SK Rapid Wien managers
FC Linz managers
Footballers from Carinthia (state)
SKN St. Pölten managers
Austrian expatriate sportspeople in Spain
Austrian expatriate footballers
Expatriate footballers in Spain